The 2019 South American Footballer of the Year award (Spanish: Rey del Fútbol de América), given to the best football player in South America by Uruguayan newspaper El País through voting by journalists across the continent, was awarded to Brazilian striker Gabriel Barbosa of Flamengo on December 31, 2019.

The award is part of the paper's "El Mejor de América" (The Best of America) awards, which also presents the awards for South American Coach of the Year (Entrenador del año en Sudamérica) and the Best XI (Equipo Ideal), composed of the best eleven players at their positions. Marcelo Gallardo of River Plate was named Coach of the Year for the second consecutive year.

Best Player

1Dani Alves played part of 2019 with Paris Saint-Germain (France).
2Filipe Luís played part of 2019 with Atlético Madrid (Spain).

Best Manager 

1Jorge Jesus spent part of 2019 as manager of Al Hilal (Saudi Arabia).
2Alexandre Guimarães has Costa Rican dual-citizenship.

Best Team 

1Filipe Luís played part of 2019 with Atlético Madrid (Spain).
2Rafinha played part of 2019 with Bayern Munich (Germany).

National awards 

1Jorge Jesus spent part of 2019 as manager of Al Hilal (Saudi Arabia).
2Gustavo Quinteros has Bolivian dual-citizenship.

References

External links

2019
Footballer Of The Year